is a Japanese comedian who performs boke in the comedy trio Neptune. He is nicknamed . He also creates stories for the trio.

Horiuchi's persona on stage and TV is known to be immature, childish and hyper-active. His comedic style is unique in the sense that he has little limits and often goes far or all-out in pursuing comedic effects.

Horiuchi is represented with Watanabe Entertainment. He is now married.

Filmography
To see his appearances with Neptune, see Neptune (owarai).

Variety
Regular

Occasional

Broadcasts

He appeared in other variety and talk shows as himself. In other programmes with Neptune, Horiuchi showed how he has a profile as a solo entertainer (to see Neptune's appearances, see Neptune (owarai)).

TV drama

Films

Radio

Advertisements

Stage

Bibliography

Discography

References

External links
 

1969 births
Living people
Japanese comedians
Japanese male actors
People from Kanagawa Prefecture